Helen Love are an indie band from Wales whose music is a combination of punk rock, bubblegum pop and disco dance music. The band was formed in 1992 by Helen Love (vocals, guitar) with Sheena (guitar, keyboards), Roxy (bass, drum machine), and Mark (keyboards). Current members are Helen, Sheena and Ricardo Autobahn.

Helen Love released only singles and EPs until 2000, when their debut studio album Love and Glitter, Hot Days and Music was released. They have since released three more studio albums, It's My Club and I'll Play What I Want To (2007, Elefant) and Day-Glo Dreams (2013, Elefant), and Smash Hits (2016, Alcopop! Records). Damaged Goods released three compilations of tracks from the band's early singles and EPs, entitled Radio Hits (1994), Radio Hits 2 (1997) and Radio Hits 3 (2002). 

The band have released recordings on many labels, including Damaged Goods, Che Trading, Sympathy for the Record Industry, Wurlizter Jukebox, Invicta Hi-Fi and Elefant Records. They are currently signed to Alcopop! records.

History
The band was formed in 1992 by Helen Love (vocals, guitar) with Sheena (guitar, keyboards), Roxy (bass, drum machine), and Mark (keyboards). Current members are Helen, Sheena and Ricardo Autobahn.

The main thematic elements in their oeuvre are Joey Ramone, summer days and bubblegum music. Love claims only to listen to the music of the Ramones. 

Helen Love released the album, It's My Club and I'll Play What I Want To, in the first week of November 2007 on Elefant Records in Spain and February 2008 in the UK.  

Their lead singer also provided vocal tracks from "We Love You" for covers of their song, "Better Set Your Phasers to Stun", by American synthpop band Hyperbubble on their 2009 eponymous EP.  The latter song later appeared on that band's  Live in London album.

In 2013 they released the album Day-Glo Dreams.  They supported this with their first gig since 2001 at the Indietracks festival, and then in November played at 100 Club for Damaged Goods 25th anniversary.

Influence and notable fans 
While none of their singles have reached the UK Top 40, Helen Love have developed a devoted cult following in indie circles, particularly at indie discos, with songs including "Long Live The UK Music Scene", "Shifty Disco Girl", "Does Your Heart Go Boom?", "We Love You", "Girl About Town", "Punk Boy" and "Debbie Loves Joey".

They recorded a session for John Peel in October 1997, and had three songs in his Festive Fifty.

Their songs have also been covered by Ash, The Queers, Katz and Tullycraft.

The band contributed a specially written song for the DVD release of Dave Gorman's Googlewhack Adventure. Gorman, a fan of the band, had previously played Helen Love songs to his audiences before he went on stage. Another big fan is Phill Jupitus, for whom the band composed the theme song for his Breakfast Show on BBC 6 Music.

Joey Ramoney 

Helen Love's second single was titled "(Sheena's In Love With) Joey Ramoney", a tribute to the band's favourite singer. A play on the Ramones' song "Sheena Is a Punk Rocker", the single was brought to Joey's attention by the UK branch of the Ramones fan club. Joey subsequently invited the band to New York to play a gig.

Joey introduced the band's Evening Session on Radio 1, and duetted with Helen on the album version of "Punk Boy".

Helen provided backing vocals on the Joey Ramone album Don't Worry About Me, singing on the track "Mr. Punchy".

Discography

Albums

Singles

EPs

References

External links 

Helen Love biography from BBC Wales

Welsh rock music groups
Sympathy for the Record Industry artists
Musical groups established in 1992
British pop punk groups
British indie pop groups
Underground punk scene in the United Kingdom
Welsh indie rock groups
British electronic music groups
Welsh pop music groups
British dance music groups
Happy hardcore musicians
Dance-rock musical groups
1992 establishments in Wales
Alcopop! Records artists